Gugile Ernest Nkwinti (born 18 December 1946) is a South African politician, previously serving in the Cabinet of South Africa as the Minister of Water and Sanitation and before as the Minister of Rural Development and Land Reform.

Education and career

He holds a diploma in nursing (psychiatry) as well as a bachelor's degree in Political Science, Public Administration and Applied Economics at Unisa. From 1972 to 1984 he worked as a professional nurse. From 1984 to 1989 he worked for the UDF, in the Eastern Cape, and he also worked as a research assistant in the department of psychology at Rhodes University. From 1990 to 1991 he served as the UDF and ANC regional secretary in the Eastern Cape. In 1994 he became the speaker of the Eastern Cape Provincial Legislature, and in 1999 he was elected as MEC for housing, local government and traditional affairs in the province. 2004 saw him holding on to his position as MEC for housing and local government, and in 2009 he was appointed as minister of rural development and land reform.

Current land reform policy

Southern African land reform is a contentious issue. He has stated that the funds are unavailable to reach the target of redistributing 30% of arable land back to the black  majority by 2014. Rather advocating a, partial, policy of reforming reclaimed, but unproductive land (up to 90% according to Nkwinti). He has stated that Nationalisation is not an option, but left future land reform policy to future national debate. He has made contentious statements, on the local news, eNCA, that commercial farmers must co-operate or share a fate "worse than Zimbabwe". Drawing critical reactions from the agricultural union, TAU SA, and the Freedom Front Plus and, later, calls for clarity from the Democratic Alliance. Has previously suggested a policy of no compensation.

References

1948 births
Living people
Alumni of the University of London
Xhosa people
African National Congress politicians
Government ministers of South Africa
Members of the National Assembly of South Africa
Members of the Eastern Cape Provincial Legislature
20th-century South African politicians
21st-century South African politicians